Tam Kai Chuen   (born 6 September 1976) is a badminton player from Hong Kong.. He represented Hong Kong at the 2000 Summer Olympics, 1998 Asian Games, 1997 East Asian Games, and 1994 Commonwealth Games.

Achievements

IBF World Grand Prix
The World Badminton Grand Prix sanctioned by International Badminton Federation (IBF) since 1983.

Men's singles

IBF International
Men's singles

Mixed doubles

References

External links
 
 

1976 births
Living people
Hong Kong male badminton players
Olympic badminton players of Hong Kong
Badminton players at the 2000 Summer Olympics
Badminton players at the 1998 Asian Games
Badminton players at the 1994 Commonwealth Games
Commonwealth Games bronze medallists for Hong Kong
Commonwealth Games medallists in badminton
Asian Games competitors for Hong Kong
Medallists at the 1994 Commonwealth Games